The American Legislative Exchange Council, otherwise known by the acronym ALEC, is a non-profit 501(c) political organization established in 1973 in Chicago. The legislative members are state and federal legislators. It is a forum to allow the members to write model laws and discuss legislative language with other members. ALEC meetings are an opportunity for the corporate and non-profit leaders to meet and provide feedback to legislators.  Member legislators can then use these model bills as templates for their own bills.

ALEC's vision statement is "A nonpartisan membership association for conservative state lawmakers who shared a common belief in limited government, free markets, federalism, and individual liberty. Their vision and initiative resulted in the creation of a voluntary membership association for people who believed that government closest to the people was fundamentally more effective, more just, and a better guarantor of freedom than the distant, bloated federal government in Washington, D.C."

ALEC keeps its membership, activities and communications confidential.  This list includes members whose identity primarily has become known through internal documents revealed to Common Cause and by research by members of the press.

Board of Scholars 
The ALEC Board of Scholars is composed of the following:
 Arthur Laffer, founder and chairman of Laffer Associates, an economic research and consulting firm
 Victor Schwartz, partner in the Washington office of the Kansas City-based law firm Shook, Hardy & Bacon, LLP, and chair of its Public Policy Group.
 Richard Vedder, Distinguished Professor of Economics at Ohio University in Athens, Ohio
 Bob Williams, founder and senior fellow of the Freedom Foundation (Washington), a public policy organization in Olympia, Washington.

Board of directors 
As of December 2017, the ALEC board of directors is composed of the following:

Board in 2013 
The ALEC board of directors is composed of the following:

Private enterprise board 
The ALEC private enterprise board is composed of the following corporate leaders:

State chairs 
ALEC state chairs from state legislatures are:

Task force members
ALEC presently has 9 task forces to "commission research, publish papers, convene workshops, issue alerts, and serve as clearinghouses of information on free market policies in the states." Each task force is co-chaired by one state legislator (termed "public") and one corporate representative(termed "private"), but Private Co-Chairs have veto power over final decisions of their task force. The primary goal of these task forces is to develop model policies for the country. "The centerpiece to the Task Forces is ALEC's model legislation. To date, ALEC has considered, written, and approved hundreds of model bills, resolutions, and policy statements."

Civil Justice
Lance Kinzer, R, Kansas representative
Victor Schwartz, representing Shook, Hardy & Bacon
Commerce, Insurance, and Economic Development
Dawn Pettengill, R, Iowa representative
Emory Wilkerson, representing State Farm Insurance
Communications and Technology
Blair Thoreson, R, North Dakota representative
Bartlett Cleland, representing the Institute for Policy Innovation
Education and Workforce Development
Howard Stephenson, R, Utah senator
Jonathan Butcher, representing Goldwater Institute
Energy, Environment, and Agriculture
Thomas Lockhart, R, Wyoming representative 
Paul Loeffelman, representing American Electric Power
Health and Human Services
Judson Hill, R, Georgia senator
Marianne Eterno, representing Guarantee Trust Life Insurance Company
International Relations
Tim Moffitt, R, North Carolina representative
Brandie Davis, representing Philip Morris International
International Delegates
Senator Cory Bernardi, Australia
MEP Adam Bielan, Poland
MEP Martin Callanan, United Kingdom
MEP Philip Claeys, Belgium
MP David Darchiashvili, Georgia
MEP Niranjan Deva, United Kingdom
MEP Christofer Fjellner, Sweden
MEP Daniel Hannan, United Kingdom
MP Chris Heaton-Harris, United Kingdom
MEP Roger Helmer, United Kingdom
Assemblywoman Ayesha Javed, Pakistan
MEP Syed Kamall, United Kingdom
MEP Michal Kaminski, Poland
MEP Miroslaw Piotrowski, Poland
MEP Ivo Strejcek, Czech Republic
MEP Konrad Szymanski, Poland
Justice Performance Project
Christopher B. Shank, R, Maryland senator
Stacie Rumenap, representing Stop Child Predators
Tax and Fiscal Policy
Ken Weyler, R, New Hampshire representative
Amanda Klump, representing Altria

Contributing authors
 Dr. Matthew Ladner, Nevada Policy Research Institute
 Dan Lips, Goldwater Institute
 Dr. Vicki E. (Murray) Alger, Vicki Murray & Associates LLC

Corporate and non-profit members
 Allergan
 Altria (formerly known as Philip Morris)
 American Bail Coalition
 American Bankers Association
 American Council of Life Insurers
 American Insurance Association
 American Legal Financial Association
 American Petroleum Institute
 American Tort Reform Association
 Americans for Tax Reform
 Amoco
 Anheuser-Busch
 Association for Competitive Technology
 AstraZeneca
 Bayer
Blue Cross Blue Shield
 BNSF Railway
 Bristol-Myers Squibb
 Cato Institute
 Celgene
 Center for Competitive Politics
 Center for Digital Media Freedom
 Centerpoint360
 CenturyLink
 Charter Communications
 Cintra
 Citizens in Charge Foundation
 Civil Justice Reform Group
 Community Financial Services Association
 Con-way
 ConocoPhillips
 Corrections Corporation of America
 Coventry Health Care
 Crown Cork and Seal Company
 CTIA – The Wireless Association
 DCI Group
 Diageo
 DirecTV
 Dow Chemical
Duke Energy
 DuPont
 Eli Lilly
 Enterprise Holdings
 Entertainment Software Association
 Entergy
 ExxonMobil
 Fadem & Associates
 Federalist Society
 FedEx
 Foundation for Excellence in Education
 Free State Foundation
 Genentech
 Geo Group (formerly known as Wackenhut)
 Georgia Pacific
 GlaxoSmithKline
 Heartland Institute
 Higher Education Research/Policy Center
 Institute for Justice
 Institute for Legal Reform
 Institute for Policy Innovation
 International Franchise Association
 James Madison Institute
 Justice Fellowship
 Kansas City Power and Light
 Koch Industries
 Lawyers for Civil Justice
 Macquarie Capital
 Management and Training Corporation
 McLeod County Farmers Union
 MV VeriSol
 National Association of Mutual Insurance Companies
 National Beer Wholesalers Association
 National Cable and Telecommunications Association
 National Coalition for Safer Roads
 National Federation of Independent Business
 National Pawnbrokers Association
 National Popular Vote
 National Rifle Association
 NetChoice
 News Corporation (parent company of Twentieth Century Fox, Wall Street Journal and Fox News)
 Novartis
Oracle
 Orchid Cellmark
 Pacific Research Institute
 Pfizer
 PhRMA
 Pickle Consulting Group
 Pioneer Institute
 Progress and Freedom Foundation
 Property Casualty Insurers
Raytheon
 Reason Foundation
 Reckitt Benckiser Pharmaceuticals
Salesforce
 Sanofi Aventis
 Satellite Broadcasting and Communications Association
 Schering Plough
 Serlin Hale
 Sprint Nextel
 State Farm Insurance
 State Policy Network
 Stop Child Predators
 Taser International
 Thomson Reuters
 Time Warner
 United Health
 United Parcel Service
 US Chamber of Commerce
 Wine Institute
 Wireless Generation
 Wise Carter Child & Caraway
 Xcel Energy

Legislative members

Alabama
 Victor Gaston, R, Speaker Pro Tempore, Alabama House of Representatives
 Cam Ward, R, Alabama House of Representatives
 Jack Williams, R, Alabama House of Representatives

Alaska
 Wes Keller, R, Alaska House of Representatives
 Bob Lynn, R, Alaska House of Representatives

Arizona
 Nancy Barto, R, Arizona House of Representatives
 Andy Biggs (politician), R, Majority leader Arizona Senate
 Rich Crandall, R, Arizona Senate
 Adam Driggs, R, Arizona Senate
 Eddie Farnsworth, R, Arizona House of Representatives
 David Gowan, R, Arizona House of Representatives
 Debbie Lesko, R, Majority Whip Arizona House of Representatives
 John McComish, R, Arizona Senate
 Don Shooter, R, Arizona Senate
 Steve Smith, R, Arizona Senate
 Kimberly Yee, R, Arizona House of Representatives

Arkansas
 Duncan Baird, R, Arkansas House of Representatives
 Cecile Bledsoe, R, Arkansas Senate
 Skip Carnine, R, Arkansas House of Representatives
 Davy Carter, R, Arkansas House of Representatives
 Alan Clark, R, Arkansas State Senate
 Linda Collins-Smith, R, Arkansas House of Representatives
 Ann Clemmer, R, Arkansas House of Representatives
 Jane English, R, Arkansas House of Representatives and Arkansas Senate
 Jon Eubanks, R, Arkansas House of Representatives
 Ed Garner, R, Arkansas House of Representatives
 Jeremy Hutchinson, R, Arkansas Senate
 Jimmy Jeffress, D, Arkansas Senate
 Johnny Key, R, Arkansas Senate
 Jason Rapert, R, Arkansas Senate
 Bill Sample, R, Arkansas House of Representatives
 Mary Lou Slinkard, R, Arkansas House of Representatives
 Jerry Taylor, D, Arkansas Senate

California
 Joel Anderson, R, California State Senate
 Dan Logue, R, California State Assembly

Colorado
 Cindy Acree, R, Colorado House of Representatives
 Greg Brophy, R, Colorado Senate
 Bill Cadman, R, Colorado House of Representatives
 Robert Gardner, R, Colorado House of Representatives
 B.J. Nikkel, R, Colorado House of Representatives
 Nancy Spence, R, Colorado Senate
 Mark Waller, R, Colorado House of Representatives

Connecticut
 Bill Aman, R, Connecticut House of Representatives
 Christie Carpino, R, Connecticut House of Representatives
 Debra Lee Hovey, R Connecticut House of Representatives
 Themis Klarides, R, Connecticut House of Representatives
 David Labriola, R, Connecticut House of Representatives
 Lawrence G. Miller, R, Connecticut House of Representatives
 Rosa Rebimbas, R, Connecticut House of Representatives
 John Shaban, R, Connecticut House of Representatives
 Kevin D. Witkos, R Connecticut Senate

Delaware
 Bradford Bennett, D, Delaware House of Representatives
 David McBride, D, Delaware Senate
 James P. Neal, Delaware Senate

Florida
 Rachel Burgin, R, Florida House of Representatives
 Brad Drake, R, Florida House of Representatives
 Matt Hudson, R, Florida House of Representatives
 Dave Murzin, R, Florida House of Representatives
 Jimmy Patronis, R, Florida House of Representatives
 John Wood, R, Florida House of Representatives

Georgia
 Don Balfour, R, Georgia Senate
 Charlice Byrd, R, Georgia House of Representatives
 David Casas, R, Georgia House of Representatives
 Josh Clark, R, Georgia House of Representatives
 Doug Collins, R, Georgia House of Representatives
 Kevin Cooke, R, Georgia House of Representatives
 Sharon Cooper, R, Georgia House of Representatives
 Bill Cowsert, R, Georgia Senate
 Johnny Grant, R, Georgia Senator
 Mark Hamilton, R, Georgia House of Representatives
 William Harmick, R, Georgia Senate
 Calvin Hill Jr., R, Georgia House of Representatives
 Bob Horne, R, Georgia House of Representatives
 Edward Lindsey, R, Georgia House of Representatives
 Barry Loudermilk, R, Georgia House of Representatives
 John Lunsford, R, Georgia House of Representatives
 Billy Maddox, R, Georgia House of Representatives
 Charles Martin, R, Georgia House of Representatives
 James Mills, R, Georgia House of Representatives
 Jack Murphy, R, Georgia Senate
 Jay Neal, R, Georgia House of Representatives
 Tom Price, R, U.S. Representative, Chairman, House Republican Policy Committee
 Tom Rice, R, Georgia House of Representatives
 Chip Rogers, R, Senate Majority Leader Georgia State Senate
 Mitch Seabaugh, R, resigned from Georgia Senate to become Deputy State Treasurer
 Donna Sheldon, R, Georgia House of Representatives
 Jesse Stone, R, Georgia Senate
 Renee Unterman, R, Georgia Senate

Hawaii
 Gene Ward, R, Hawaii House of Representatives

Idaho
 Scott Bedke, R, Idaho House of Representatives
 Darrell Bolz, R, Idaho House of Representatives
 Dean Cameron, R, Idaho Senate
 James Clark, R, Idaho House of Representatives
 Denton Darrington, R, Idaho Senate
 Frank Henderson, R, Idaho House of Representatives
 Patti Anne Lodge, R, Idaho Senate
 Shirley McKague, R, Idaho House of Representatives
 Jim Patrick, R, Idaho House of Representatives
 Bert Stevenson, R, Idaho House of Representatives
 Jeff Thompson, R, Idaho House of Representatives

Illinois
 Tom Cross, R, Illinois House of Representatives
 Kirk Dillard, R, Illinois Senate
 Renée Kosel, R, Illinois House of Representatives
 Dennis Reboletti, R, Illinois House of Representatives
 David Reis, R, Illinois House of Representatives
 Dale Risinger, R, Illinois Senate
 Chapin Rose, R, Illinois House of Representatives
 Dan Rutherford, R, Illinois Senate

Indiana
 Brian Bosma, R, Indiana House of Representatives
 Timothy Brown, R, Indiana House of Representatives
 Jim Buck, R Indiana Senate
 Bill Davis, R, Indiana House of Representatives
 Richard Dodge, R, Indiana House of Representatives
 William Friend, R, Indiana House of Representatives
 David Frizzell, R, Indiana House of Representatives
 Douglas Gutwein, R, Indiana House of Representatives
 Eric Koch, R, Indiana House of Representatives
 Eric Turner, R, Indiana House of Representatives
 Jackie Walorski, R, Indiana House of Representatives

Iowa
 Betty DeBoef, R, Iowa House of Representatives
 Sandra Greiner, R, Iowa Senate
 Chris Hagenow, R, Iowa House of Representatives
 Tim Kapucian, R, Iowa Senate
 Doris Kelley, D, Iowa House of Representatives
 Linda J. Miller, R, Iowa House of Representatives
 Kim Pearson, R, Iowa Senate
 Dawn Pettengill, R, Iowa House of Representatives
 James Seymour, R, Iowa Senate
 Linda Upmeyer, Minority Whip Iowa House of Representatives
 Pat Ward, R, Iowa Senate
 Ralph Watts, R, Iowa House of Representatives
 Charles Schneider, R, Iowa Senate President
 Rob Taylor, R, Iowa House of Representatives

Kansas
 Karen Brownlee, R, Kansas Senate
 Terry Bruce, R, Kansas Senate
 Rob Bruchman, R, Kansas House of Representatives
 Steve Brunk, R, Kansas House of Representatives
 Terry Calloway, R, Kansas House of Representatives
 Richard Carlson, R, Kansas House of Representatives
 Pete DeGraff, R, Kansas House of Representatives
 Mario Goico, R, Kansas House of Representatives
 TerriLois Gregory, R, Kansas House of Representatives
 Amanda Grosserode, R, Kansas House of Representatives
 Gary Hayzlett, R, Kansas House of Representatives
 Carl Holmes, R, Kansas House of Representatives
 Mitch Holmes, R, Kansas House of Representatives
 Steve Huebert, R, Kansas House of Representatives
 Richard Kelsey, R, Kansas Senate
 Lance Kinzer, R, Kansas House of Representatives
 Marvin Kleeb, R, Kansas House of Representatives
 Forrest Knox, R, Kansas House of Representatives
 Garret Love, R, Kansas Senate
 Julia Lynn, R, Kansas Senate
 Peggy Mast, R, Assistant Majority Leader Kansas House of Representatives
 Ty Masterson, R, Kansas Senate
 Kelly Meigs, R, Kansas House of Representatives
 Raymond Merrick, R, Kansas Senate
 Susan Mosier, R, Kansas House of Representatives
 Don Myers, R, Kansas House of Representatives
 Ralph Ostmeyer, R, Kansas Senate
 Joe Patton, R, Kansas House of Representatives
 Mike Petersen, R, Kansas Senate
 Mary Pilcher-Cook, R, Iowa Senate
 Larry Powell, R, Kansas House of Representatives
 Dennis Pyle, R, Kansas Senate
 Marc Rhoades, R, Kansas House of Representatives
 John Rubin, R, Kansas House of Representatives
 Ronald Ryckman, R, Kansas House of Representatives
 Scott Schwab, R, Kansas House of Representatives
 Sharon Schwartz, R, Kansas House of Representatives
 Chris Steineger, R, Kansas Senate
 Susan Wagle, R, Kansas Senate

Kentucky
 Walter Blevins, D, Kentucky Senate
 Tom Buford, R, Kentucky House of Representatives
 Julian Carroll, D, former governor of Kentucky, Kentucky Senate
 Ron Crimm, R, Kentucky House of Representatives
 Julie Denton, R, Kentucky Senate
 Joseph Fischer, R, Kentucky House of Representatives
 Mike Harmon, R, Kentucky House of Representatives
 Ray S. Jones, D, Kentucky Senate
 Alice Kerr, R, Kentucky House of Representatives
 Sal Santoro, R, Kentucky House of Representatives
 Dan Seum, R, Republican Caucus chair Kentucky Senate
 Robert Stivers, R, Majority Leader Kentucky Senate
 Johnny Ray Turner, D, Democratic Caucus chair Kentucky Senate
 Jackie Westwood, R, Kentucky House of Representatives

Louisiana
 Jack Donahue, R, Louisiana State Senate
 Franklin Foil, R, Louisiana House of Representatives
 Frank A. Hoffmann, R, Louisiana House of Representatives
 Daniel Martiny, R, Louisiana Senate
 Fred Mills, R, Louisiana House of Representatives
 Neil Riser, R, Louisiana State Senate

Maine
 Ken Fletcher, R, Maine House of Representatives
 Debra Plowman, R, Maine Senate
 Richard Rosen, R, Maine Senate
 Michael Thibodeau, R, Maine Senate

Maryland
 Gail Bates, R, Maryland House of Delegates
 Donald Dwyer, R, Maryland House of Delegates
 Adelaide Eckardt, R, Maryland Senate
 Joseph Getty, R, Maryland House of Delegates
 Jeannie Haddaway, R, Maryland House of Delegates
 Michael Hough, R, Maryland House of Delegates
 Susan Krebs, R, Maryland House of Delegates
 Susan McComas, R, Maryland House of Delegates
 Neil Parrott, R, Maryland House of Delegates
 Christopher Shank, R, Maryland Senate
 Tanya Shewell, R, Maryland House of Delegates
 Nancy Stocksdale, R, Maryland House of Delegates

Massachusetts
 Nicholas Boldyga, R, Massachusetts House of Representatives
 Harriett Stanley, D, Massachusetts House of Representatives

Michigan
 Bruce Caswell, R, Michigan House of Representatives
 Alan Cropsey
 Kenneth Horn, R, Michigan House of Representatives
 Kenneth Kurtz, R, Michigan House of Representatives
 Matthew Lori, R, Michigan House of Representatives
 Tonya Schuitmaker, R, Michigan Senate

Minnesota
 Bruce Anderson, R, Minnesota House of Representatives
 Paul Anderson, R, Minnesota House of Representatives
 King Banaian, R, Minnesota House of Representatives
 Michael Beard, R, Minnesota House of Representatives
 Mike Benson, R, Minnesota House of Representatives
 Roger Chamberlain, R, Minnesota Senate
 Matt Dean, R, Majority Leader, Minnesota House of Representatives
 Connie Doepke, R, Minnesota House of Representatives
 Steve Drazkowski, R, Minnesota House of Representatives
 Sondra Erickson, R, Minnesota House of Representatives
 Pat Garofalo, R, Minnesota House of Representatives
 Chris Gerlach, R, Minnesota Senate
 Gretchen Hoffman, R, Minnesota Senate
 Michael Jungbauer, R, Minnesota Senate
 Warren Limmer, R, Minnesota Senate
 Carol McFarlane, R, Minnesota House of Representatives
 Pam Myhra, R, Minnesota House of Representatives
 Gen Olson, R, Minnesota Senate
 Mike Parry, R, Minnesota Senate
 Joyce Peppin, R, Minnesota House of Representatives
 Linda Runbeck, R, Minnesota House of Representatives
 Ron Shimanski, R, Minnesota House of Representatives
 Dean Urdahl, R, Minnesota House of Representatives
 Kurt Zellers, R, Speaker of the Minnesota House of Representatives

Mississippi
 Mark Baker, R, Mississippi House of Representatives
 Charles Jim Beckett, R, Mississippi House of Representatives
 Nickey Reed Browning, R, Mississippi State Senate
 Lester Carpenter, R, Mississippi House of Representatives
 Lydia Chassaniol, R, Mississippi State Senate
 Becky Currie, R, Mississippi House of Representatives
 William Denny Jr., R, Mississippi House of Representatives
 Jim Ellington, R, Mississippi House of Representatives
 Harvey Fillingane, R, Mississippi House of Representatives
 Joey Fillingane, R, Mississippi State Senate
 Jeffrey Guice, R, Mississippi House of Representatives
 Philip Gunn, R, Speaker Mississippi House of Representatives
 Briggs Hopson, R, Mississippi State Senate
 Kevin McGee, R, Mississippi House of Representatives
 Walter Michel, R, Mississippi State Senate
 Margaret Ellis Rogers, R, Mississippi House of Representatives
 Elton Gregory Snowden, R, Mississippi House of Representatives
 Gary Staples, R, Mississippi House of Representatives
 Jerry Turner, R, Mississippi State Senate
 Tommy Woods, R, Mississippi House of Representatives

Missouri
 Sue Allen, R, Missouri House of Representatives
 Jane Cunningham, R, Missouri Senate
 Stanley Cox, R, Missouri House of Representatives
 Scott Dieckhaus, R, Missouri House of Representatives
 John Diehl, R, Missouri House of Representatives
 Tony Dugger, R, Missouri of Representatives
 Sue Entlicher, R, Missouri of Representatives
 Dave Hinson, R, Missouri of Representatives
 Tim Jones, R, Majority Leader, Missouri House of Representatives
 Rob Mayer, R, President Pro Tempore, Missouri Senate
 Cole McNary, R, Missouri House of Representatives, current candidate for Missouri State Treasurer
 Kathleen Meiners, R, Missouri House of Representatives
 Brian Munzlinger, R, Missouri Senate
 Brian Nieves, R, Missouri Senate
 Mike Parson, R, Missouri Governor
 Therese Sander, R, Missouri House of Representatives
 Rodney Schad, R, Missouri House of Representatives
 Vicki Schneider, R, Missouri House of Representatives
 Jason T. Smith, R, Missouri House of Representatives
 Steve Tilley, R, Speaker of the Missouri House of Representatives
 Billy Pat Wright, R, Missouri House of Representatives

Montana
 Dee L. Brown, R, Montana House of Representatives
 Kris Hansen, R, Montana House of Representatives
 Dennis Himmelberger, R, Montana House of Representatives
 David Howard, R, Montana House of Representatives
 Llewelyn Jones, R, Montana House of Representatives
 Steve Lavin, R, MontanaHouse of Representatives
 Gary MacLaren, R, Montana House of Representatives
 Tom McGillvray, R, Montana House of Representatives
 Mike Miller, R, Montana House of Representatives
 Michael More, R, Montana House of Representatives
 Amy Stasia Perkins, R, Montana Senate
 Lawrence Perkins, R, Montana Senate
 Ken Peterson, R, Montana House of Representatives
 Scott Reichner, R, Montana House of Representatives
 Cary Smith, R, Montana House of Representatives

Nebraska
 Pam Brown, Nebraska Legislature
 Deb Fischer, Nebraska Legislature, elected to United States Senate as a Republican
 Ken Haar, Nebraska Legislature
 Jeremiah Nordquist, Nebraska Legislature
 Jim Smith, Nebraska Legislature

Nevada
 Barbara Cegavske, R, Nevada Senate
 Don Gustavson, R, Nevada Senate
 Dean Rhoads, R, Nevada Senate
 James Settelmeyer, R, Nevada Senate

New Hampshire
 Mary M. Allen, R, New Hampshire House of Representatives
 Gary L. Daniels, R, New Hampshire House of Representatives
 William L. O'Brien, R, Speaker, New Hampshire House of Representatives
 Elaine Swinford, R, New Hampshire House of Representatives
 Joseph Thomas, R, New Hampshire House of Representatives
 Jordan G. Ulery, R, New Hampshire House of Representatives
 Maurice Villeneuve, R, New Hampshire House of Representatives
 Francine Wendelboe, R, New Hampshire House of Representatives

New Jersey
 Mary Pat Angelini, R, New Jersey General Assembly
 Christopher "Kip" Bateman, R, New Jersey Senate
 Anthony Bucco, R, New Jersey Senate
 Gerald Cardinale, R, New Jersey Senate
 Steven Oroho, R, New Jersey Senate
 Jay Webber, R, New Jersey General Assembly

New Mexico
 Rod Adair, R, no longer in New Mexico Senate
 Janice Arnold-Jones, R, no longer in New Mexico House of Representatives
 Vernon Asbill, R, no longer in New Mexico Senate
 Paul Bandy, R, New Mexico House of Representatives
 Mark Boitano, R, no longer in New Mexico Senate
 Kent Cravens, R, no longer in New Mexico Senate
 Anna Marie Crook, R, New Mexico House of Representatives
 Stuart Ingle, R, Minority leader New Mexico Senate
 Dennis Kintigh, R, no longer in New Mexico House of Representatives
 William Payne, R, Minority Whip New Mexico Senate
 William Rehm, R, New Mexico House of Representatives
 William Sharer, R, New Mexico Senate
 Thomas C. Taylor, R, New Mexico House of Representatives

New York
 Owen H. Johnson, R, New York State Senate

North Carolina
 Hugh Blackwell, R, North Carolina General Assembly
 Justin Burr, R, North Carolina General Assembly
 Debbie Clary, R, North Carolina Senate
 George Cleveland, R, North Carolina General Assembly
 Daniel McComas, R, North Carolina General Assembly
 Tim Moore, R, North Carolina General Assembly
 Paul Stam, R, North Carolina General Assembly

North Dakota
 John Andrist, R, North Dakota Senate
 Randy Boehning, R, North Dakota House of Representatives
 Alan H. Carlson, R, Majority Leader North Dakota House of Representatives
 Bette Grande, R, North Dakota House of Representatives
 Patrick Hatlestad, R, North Dakota House of Representatives
 Craig Headland, R, North Dakota House of Representatives
 Lawrence Klemin, R, North Dakota House of Representatives
 Kim Koppelman, R, North Dakota House of Representatives
 Karen Krebsbach, R, North Dakota Senate
 David Nething, R, North Dakota Senate
 Blair Thoreson, R, North Dakota House of Representatives
 Dwight Wrangham, R, North Dakota House of Representatives

Ohio
 John Adams, R, Ohio House of Representatives
 Danny Bubp, R, Ohio House of Representatives
 Ron Amstutz, R, Ohio House of Representatives
 Peter Beck, R, Ohio House of Representatives
 Louis Blessing, R, Ohio House of Representatives
 John Boehner, R, Speaker of the United States House of Representatives
 William Coley, R, Ohio House of Representatives
 Tim Derickson, R, Ohio House of Representatives
 Matt Huffman, R, Ohio House of Representatives
 Casey Kozlowski, R, Ohio House of Representatives
 Frank LaRose, R, Ohio Senate
 Ronald Maag, R, Ohio House of Representatives
 Jarrod Martin, R, Ohio House of Representatives
 Barbara Sears, R, Ohio House of Representatives
 Bill Seitz, R, Ohio Senate
 Andrew Thompson, R, Ohio House of Representatives
 Joe Uecker, R, Ohio House of Representatives
 Lynn Wachtmann, R, Ohio House of Representatives

Oklahoma
 Gary Banz, R, Oklahoma House of Representatives
 Bill Brown, R, Oklahoma Senate
 Lisa Johnson-Billy, R, Oklahoma House of Representatives
 Sally Kern, R, Oklahoma House of Representatives
 Stephen C. Martin, R, Oklahoma House of Representatives
 Michael Mazzei, R, Oklahoma Senate
 Mark McCullough, R, Oklahoma House of Representatives
 Pam Peterson, R, Oklahoma House of Representatives
 Gary Stanislawski, R, Oklahoma Senate
 G. Harold Wright, R, Oklahoma House of Representatives

Oregon
 Kevin Cameron, R, Oregon House of Representatives
 Jason Conger, R, Oregon House of Representatives
 Sal Esquivel, R, Oregon House of Representatives
 Ted Ferrioli, R, Oregon House of Representatives
 Tim Freeman, R, Oregon House of Representatives
 Larry George, R, Oregon House of Representatives
 Fred Girod, R, Oregon House of Representatives
 Bruce Hanna, R, Co-Speaker of the Oregon House of Representatives
 Wally Hicks, R, Oregon House of Representatives
 John Huffman, R, Oregon House of Representatives
 Mark Johnson, R, Oregon House of Representatives
 Bill Kennemer, R, Oregon House of Representatives
 Shawn Lindsay, R, Oregon House of Representatives
 Mike McLane, R, Oregon House of Representatives
 Sherrie Sprenger, R, Oregon House of Representatives
 Kim Thatcher, R, Oregon House of Representatives
 Jim Thompson, R, Oregon House of Representatives
 Matthew Wand, R, Oregon House of Representatives
 Gene Whisnant, R, Oregon House of Representatives

Pennsylvania
 Matthew Baker, R, Pennsylvania House of Representatives
 Brian L. Ellis, Pennsylvania House of Representatives
 John R. Evans, R, Pennsylvania House of Representatives
 Tim Krieger, R, Pennsylvania House of Representatives
 Ronald Marsico, R, Pennsylvania House of Representatives
 Bob Mensch, R, Pennsylvania Senate
 Ron Miller, R, Pennsylvania House of Representatives

Rhode Island
 Jon Brien, D, Rhode Island House of Representatives
 Paul Jabour, D, Rhode Island Senate
 Francis T. Maher Jr., R, Rhode Island Senate
 Robert A. Watson, R, Rhode Island House of Representatives

South Carolina
 Thomas Alexander, R, South Carolina Senate
 Jimmy Bales, R, South Carolina House of Representatives
 Liston Barfield, R, South Carolina House of Representatives
 Joan Brady, R, South Carolina House of Representatives
 Chip Campsen, R, South Carolina Senate
 Harry Cato, R, Speaker Pro Tempore South Carolina House of Representatives
 Bobby Harrell, R, Speaker, South Carolina House of Representatives
 Larry A. Martin, R, South Carolina Senate
 Harvey S. Peeler Jr., R, Majority Leader, South Carolina Senate
 Mike Rose, R, South Carolina Senate
 Garry Smith, R, South Carolina House of Representatives
 Thad Viers, R, South Carolina House of Representatives
 Kent M. Williams, D, South Carolina Senate

South Dakota
 Kristin Conzet, R, South Dakota House of Representatives
 Bob Deelstra, R, South Dakota House of Representatives
 Brian Gosch, R, South Dakota House of Representatives
 Jon Hansen, R, South Dakota House of Representatives
 Tom Hansen, R, South Dakota Senate
 Roger Hunt, R, South Dakota House of Representatives
 Phil Jensen, R, South Dakota House of Representatives
 Stacey Nelson, R, South Dakota House of Representatives
 David Novstrup, R, South Dakota House of Representatives
 Betty Olson, R, South Dakota House of Representatives
 Russell Olson, R, South Dakota House of Representatives
 Deb Peters, R, South Dakota Senate
 Valentine B. Rausch, R, South Dakota House of Representatives

Tennessee
 Joe C. Carr, R, Tennessee House of Representatives
 Vince Dean, R, Tennessee House of Representatives
 Vance Dennis, R, Tennessee House of Representatives
 Jimmy Eldridge, R, Tennessee House of Representatives
 Joshua Evans, R, Tennessee House of Representatives
 Dale Ford, R, Tennessee House of Representatives
 Kelly Keisling, R, Tennessee House of Representatives
 Brian Kelsey, R, Tennessee Senate
 Jon Lundberg, R, Tennessee House of Representatives
 Susan Lynn, R, Tennessee House of Representatives
 Gerald McCormick, R, Tennessee House of Representatives
 Steve McDaniel, R, Tennessee House of Representatives
 Richard Montgomery, R, Tennessee House of Representatives
 Mark Norris, R, Majority Leader Tennessee Senate
 Barrett Rich, R, Tennessee House of Representatives
 Charles Sargent, R, Tennessee House of Representatives
 Tony Shipley, R, Tennessee House of Representatives
 Curry Todd, R, Tennessee House of Representatives

Texas
 William Callegari, R, Texas House of Representatives
 Byron Cook, R, Texas House of Representatives
 Allen Fletcher, R, Texas House of Representatives
 Dan Flynn, R, Texas House of Representatives
 Mike Hamilton, R, Texas House of Representatives
 Kelly Hancock, R, Texas House of Representatives
 Patricia Harless, R, Texas House of Representatives
 Chris Harris, R, Texas Senate
 Glenn Hegar, R, Texas House of Representatives
 Harvey Hilderbran, R, Texas House of Representatives
 Charles F. Howard, R, Texas House of Representatives
 Todd Hunter, R, Texas House of Representatives
 Jim Jackson, R, Texas House of Representatives
 Eric Johnson, D, Texas House of Representatives
 Jodie Anne Laubenberg, R, Texas House of Representatives, Texas chapter president in 2013
 Jerry Madden, R, Texas House of Representatives
 Rob Orr, R, Texas House of Representatives
 John Otto, R, Texas House of Representatives
 Larry Phillips, R, Texas House of Representatives
 Kel Seliger, R, Texas Senate
 Todd Smith, R, Texas House of Representatives
 Wayne Smith, R, Texas House of Representatives
 Larry Taylor, R, Texas House of Representatives

Utah
 Curtis S. Bramble, R, Utah Senate
 Wayne Harper, R, Utah House of Representatives
 Chris Herrod, R, Utah House of Representatives
 Todd Kiser, R, Utah House of Representatives
 Wayne L. Niederhauser, R, Utah Senate
 Stephen Urquhart, R, Utah Senate
 Michael Waddoups, R, Utah Senate
 Carl Wimmer, R, Utah House of Representatives

Vermont
 Patrick Brennan, R, Vermont House of Representatives
 Margaret Flory, R, Vermont Senate
 Kathleen Keenan, R, Vermont House of Representatives
 Kevin J. Mullin, R, Assistant Minority Leader Vermont Senate

Virginia
 David Albo, R, Virginia House of Delegates
 Kathy Byron, R, Virginia House of Delegates
 Benjamin Cline, R, Virginia House of Delegates
 Mark Cole, R, Virginia House of Delegates
 John A. Cosgrove Jr., R, Virginia House of Delegates
 William Howell, R, Virginia House of Delegates
 William Janis, R, Virginia House of Delegates
 Terry Kilgore, R, Virginia House of Delegates
 L. Scott Lingamfelter, R, Virginia House of Delegates
 James Massie, R, Virginia House of Delegates 
 Stephen H. Martin, R, Virginia House of Delegates
 Thomas Norment, R, Virginia Senate
 Christopher Peace, R, Virginia House of Delegates
 Lacey Putney, Independent (caucuses with R), Virginia House of Delegates
 Frederick Quayle, R, Virginia Senate
 Frank Ruff, R, Virginia Senate
 Richard Tata, R, Virginia House of Delegates

Washington
 Jan Angel, R, Washington Senate
 Don Benton, R, Washington Senate, retired
 Linda Evans Parlette, R, Washington Senate
 Bill Hinkle, R, Washington House of Representatives, retired
 Troy Kelly, D, former Washington State Auditor
 Charles Ross, R, Washington House of Representatives, retired
 Matt Shea, R, Washington House of Representatives
 Val Stevens, R, Washington Senate, retired

West Virginia
 Eric Householder, R, West Virginia House of Delegates
 Larry Kump, R, West Virginia House of Delegates

Wisconsin
 Kathy Bernier, R, Wisconsin State Assembly
 Alberta Darling, R, Wisconsin State Senate
 Mike Endsley, R, Wisconsin State Assembly
 Scott Fitzgerald, R, Wisconsin State Senate, Majority Leader
 Chris Kapenga, R, Wisconsin State Assembly
 John Klenke, R, Wisconsin State Assembly
 Scott Krug, R, Wisconsin State Assembly
 Mike Kuglitsch, R, Wisconsin State Assembly
 Frank Lasee, R, Wisconsin State Senate
 Mary Lazich, R, Wisconsin State Senate
 Terry Moulton, R, Wisconsin State Senate
 John Nygren, R, Wisconsin State Senate
 Patricia Strachota, R, Majority Leader of the Wisconsin State Assembly
 Chris Taylor, D, Wisconsin State Assembly 
 Travis Tranel – no longer a member. Left Dec 2012, R, Wisconsin State Assembly
 Robin J. Vos, R, Speaker of the Wisconsin State Assembly

Wyoming
 Jon Botten, R, Wyoming House of Representatives
 Bruce Burns, R, Wyoming Senate
 Richard Cannady, R, Wyoming House of Representatives
 Cale Case, R, Wyoming Senate
 Amy Edmonds, R, Wyoming House of Representatives
 John Hastert, R, Wyoming Senate
 Peter S. Illoway, R, Wyoming House of Representatives
 Allen Jaggi, R, Wyoming House of Representatives
 Grant Larson, R, Wyoming Senate
 Carl Loucks, R, Wyoming House of Representatives
 Curt Meier, R, Wyoming Senate
 Lorraine Quarberg, R, Wyoming House of Representatives
 Lisa Shepperson, R, Wyoming House of Representatives
 Tim Stubson, R, Wyoming House of Representatives
 Clarence Vranish, R, Wyoming House of Representatives
 Sue Wallis, R, Wyoming House of Representatives
 Daniel Zwonitzer, R, Wyoming House of Representatives

See also
 List of former members

References

External links
 ALEC official website
 ALEC Corporations at SourceWatch

Political organizations based in the United States
Business organizations based in the United States
Government-related professional associations in the United States
Conservatism-related lists